Ossietzkystraße is a street in the Pankow borough of Berlin. It is located between the Schlosspark and the Berliner Straße. In the street there is a statue of Carl von Ossietzky, after whom the street is named. The street crosses the river Panke, and is connected to the Majakowskiring. The street was known as Schloss Straße until it was renamed by the East German government in the 1970s.

Streets in Berlin
Pankow